This is a list of flag bearers who have represented Bahamas at the Olympics.

Flag bearers carry the national flag of their country at the opening ceremony of the Olympic Games.

See also
Bahamas at the Olympics

References

Bahamas at the Olympics
Bahamas
Olympic